Cruciata laevipes is a species of flowering plant in the family Rubiaceae. It is commonly known as crosswort, smooth bedstraw or Luc na croise in Gaelic. The Latin epithet laevipes refers to the smooth stalk.

The common name crosswort is a 16th century translation of the botanists' Latin cruciata planta, meaning "cross plant", i.e., with leaves in a cross-like arrangement.

Description
The inner flowers are male and soon fall off, whilst the outer are bisexual and produce the fruit. The flowers smell of honey. Of the whorls of four leaves, only two in each group are real leaves, the other two being stipules. It is associated with arbuscular mycorrhiza that penetrate the cortical cells of the roots. In the United Kingdom it flowers April to June. Pollination is by bees and flies.

Distribution and habitat
Cruciata laevipes is found in most of Europe as well as from northern Turkey, Iran, the Caucasus, and the western Himalayas.  It is also reportedly naturalized in Ontario County in New York State. Cruciata laevipes is found in meadows, road verges, riverbanks, scrub and open woodland, generally on well-drained calcareous soils.

Uses

Cruciata laevipes is little used in herbal medicine today, but it was once recommended as a remedy for rupture, rheumatism and dropsy.  Bald's Leechbook recommended crosswort as a cure for headaches.

References

External links
US Department of Agriculture, plants profile, Cruciata laevipes Opiz, smooth bedstraw
Cruciata in the World Checklist of Rubiaceae
 Photograph of C. laevipes
 C. laevipes photographs
 

Plants described in 1753
Taxa named by Carl Linnaeus
Rubieae
Herbs
Medicinal plants of Europe
Flora of Belgium
Flora of Sardinia
Flora of Corsica
Flora of France
Flora of Great Britain
Flora of Austria
Flora of the Czech Republic
Flora of Germany
Flora of Hungary
Flora of Switzerland
Flora of the Netherlands
Flora of Poland
Flora of Portugal
Flora of Spain
Flora of Kosovo
Flora of Albania
Flora of Bulgaria
Flora of Italy
Flora of Greece
Flora of Romania
Flora of Turkey
Flora of Iran
Flora of New York (state)
Flora of Serbia
Flora of Croatia
Flora of Ukraine
Flora of Russia
Flora of Azerbaijan
Flora of Georgia (country)
Flora of Armenia
Flora without expected TNC conservation status